The fauna of Connecticut comprise a variety of animal species.

 The state bird is the American robin.
 The state insect is the European mantis.
 The state animal is the sperm whale.
 The state shellfish is the eastern oyster.
 The state fish is the American shad.
 The state fossil is the Eubrontes giganteus.

Biodiversity
There are, as of 2004, 256 Connecticut species listed as endangered, threatened or of special concern.  These are 11 species of mammals, 50 species of birds, 11 species of reptiles, 7 species of amphibians, 7 species of fish, and 170 species of invertebrates.

Ancient life

Notable sites preserving the prehistoric history of Connecticut include the Peabody Museum of Natural History and Dinosaur State Park.

Extinct species that once roamed Connecticut include Coelophysis, Dilophosaurus, and Eubrontes.

List of native species
Sources appear below.

Annelids
 Ampharete arctica
 Capitella capitata
 Capitellidae
 Eteone lactea
 Glycera dibranchiata
 Alitta (Nereis) succinea
 Opheliidae sp.
 Phyllodoce sp.
 Polydora sp.
 Scoloplos robustus
 Spio setosa
 Spionidae
 Streblospio benedicti
 Syllidae sp.

Arthropods
 Chiridotea spp.
 Gammarus sp.
 Neomysis americana
 Sphaeroma quadridentata

Mollusks
 Acteocina canaliculata
 Gemma gemma
 Nassarius obsoletus
 Mulinia lateralis
 Mya arenaria
 Nucula sp.
 Periploma papyratium
 Retusa canaliculata
 Tellina agillis

See also
 Flora of Connecticut
 List of birds of Connecticut
 List of mammals of Connecticut
 List of mammals of New England

References

Further reading
 Aspects of Connecticut's Physical Geography
 Connecticut Audubon Society
 Connecticut Department of Environmental Protection - Natural Diversity Data Base
 Fishes of the Connecticut River
 The Flora and Fauna of Branford